Stypellopsis is a genus of fungi in the order Auriculariales. Basidiocarps (fruit bodies) are effused, gelatinous, crystalline or net-like  and occur on fallen conifer wood. Species were formerly placed in Stypella or Protomerulius, but molecular research, based on cladistic analysis of DNA sequences, distinguishes Stypellopsis from these genera and from the morphologically similar genus Mycostilla. The type species occurs in northern Europe, Stypellopsis farlowii in North America.

References

Auriculariales
Basidiomycota genera
Taxa described in 2018